The 1910 County Championship was the 21st officially organised running of the County Championship, and ran from 2 May to 1 September 1910. Kent County Cricket Club won their third championship title, their second title in successive seasons. Somerset finished bottom of the table, failing to win a match all season.

Table

 One point was awarded for a win. Final placings were decided by dividing the number of points earned by the number of completed matches (i.e. those that ended in a win, loss or draw), and multiplying by 100.

Statistics

See also
 1910 English cricket season
 Derbyshire County Cricket Club in 1910
 Kent County Cricket Club in 1910

References

1910 in English cricket
County Championship seasons
County